Insurgence Records is a Canadian-based independent record label founded in 2000. The street music label specializes in rock music subgenres associated with the skinhead subculture, including Oi!, street punk and hardcore. Insurgence Records releases recordings from established acts and up-and-comers.

The original compilation series that marked the formative years of the label, Class Pride World Wide sums up the label's pro-working class and anti-fascist stance, as well as the label's role of providing a platform for the progressive aspects of the skinhead subculture. A partial list of bands on the label include: Angelic Upstarts (England), Hold a Grudge (Canada) Bishops Green (Canada), The Bois (Singapore),  The Oppressed (Wales), The Prowlers (Canada), Razors in the Night (United States) and Stage Bottles (Germany)

References

External links
Insurgence Records - official website
"Insurgence Records: Working Class Culture" – from People’s Voice
"Insurgence Records Interview" – from Redstar 73
Interview with Insurgence Records - from oioimusic

Record labels established in 2000 
Canadian independent record labels
Anti-fascist organizations
Anti-racist organizations in Canada
Hardcore record labels
Punk record labels
Skinhead
Street punk